Ludwig Theodor Ferdinand Max Wallraf (18 September 1859 – 6 September 1941) was a German politician who served as mayor of Cologne from 1907 to 1917. He was State Minister of the Interior from 1917 to 1918. As a German National People's Party politician, he was a member of the Reichstag from 1924 to 1930 and briefly served as its President in 1924/25.

Early life and education 
Wallraf was born in Cologne. His parents were the lawyer and legal administrator Reiner Ludwig Wallraf (died 1877) and Wilhelmine Wallraf,  Berghaus (died 1906). He became a trainee at the Oberlandesgericht Köln court in Cologne in 1881. In 1885, he was sent to the  Oppeln (now Opole) in Upper Silesia. He passed his state examination in Berlin in December 1886.

Administrative and political career 
After serving in the provincial administration of the Rhine Province in Koblenz, he became head of the police in Aachen, where he served from 1900 to 1903.
On 13 July 1907, after lengthy negotiations involving his father-in-law Joseph Pauli, Wallraf was unanimously elected mayor of Cologne, as a Catholic following two Protestant mayors and as a compromise candidate who was acceptable to all factions. As mayor of Cologne, he also was a member of the Prussian House of Lords. He resigned in August 1917 when he was offered the position of Under-Secretary of State in the Ministry of the Interior and was replaced as mayor by Konrad Adenauer, who had worked as his deputy before and who was married to Wallraf's niece Emma Weyer. As State Minister of the Interior in the cabinet of Reich Chancellor Georg von Hertling, Wallraf supported the suppression of the German strike of January 1918. In addition to his tenure as interior minister (23 October 1917–6 October 1918), Wallraf was minister without portfolio in the state government of Prussia from 7 January to 4 October 1918.

From 1921 to 1924, Wallraf was a member of the Landtag of Prussia and from 1924 to 1930 of the Reichstag, representing the national-conservative German National People's Party (DNVP).

Wallraf was elected President of the Reichstag on 28 May 1924, after the May 1924 German federal election, as the DNVP together with the Agricultural League was the largest parliamentary group. He was replaced by his predecessor Paul Löbe on 7 January 1925 after the December 1924 German federal election. During 1924, Wallraf was among those DNVP members who did not oppose the Dawes Plan, which caused a bitter dispute within the DNVP.

Wallraf became a member of the Nazi Party on 1 May 1933.

Personal life 
Wallraf was married twice. His first marriage was in 1889 to Emma Kesselkaul (22 July 1868 – 29 October 1892), the daughter of a merchant. Their son  (1891–1972) also studied law and became an administrator. In 1897, Wallraf got married for a second time, to Anna Pauli (1871–1932), the daughter of landowner and president of the Rhineland Agricultural Society, Joseph Pauli. They had two sons.

He died in Oberstdorf in 1941. A street in the Cologne district of Lindenthal is named after him.

References

Footnotes

Sources

|-

|-

1859 births
1941 deaths
Mayors of Cologne
Members of the Landtag of Prussia
Members of the Prussian House of Lords
German National People's Party politicians
Members of the Reichstag of the Weimar Republic
German Roman Catholics
Interior ministers of Germany